Mohammad Afzal  (born 6 June 1955) is a former Pakistani cricketer who played for several teams in Pakistani domestic cricket, and later also in England. He played as a right-handed top-order batsman.

Afzal was born in Kenya, but never played high-level cricket there. He made his first-class debut in Pakistan in August 1975, scoring 71 not out for Hyderabad against Sukkur in the Sikandar Ali Bhutto Cup. Later in the 1975–76 season, Afzal represented the Pakistan Universities team in the BCCP Patron's Trophy and Quaid-i-Azam Trophy, playing three matches in the former competition and one in the latter. In a Patron's Trophy match against Lahore B, he made 101 not out, which was to be his highest first-class score and only century. For the 1976–77 Quaid-i-Azam Trophy, Afzal switched to Sindh B, although he played only a single game for that team (against the National Bank of Pakistan).

Beginning in 1981, Afzal made occasional appearances for Cambridgeshire in England's Minor Counties Championship. He never managed a full season, however, last playing for Cambridgeshire in 1985. Back in Pakistan, Afzal's final first-class appearances came in the 1981–82 Quaid-i-Azam Trophy, when he represented the Industrial Development Bank team. He played in all nine of his team's matches, and scored 309 runs with a best of 43 against Karachi. Among his teammates, only Saleem Yousuf and Ashfaq Malik scored more runs. Afzal finished with a career first-class batting average of 25.25, from 17 matches.

References

External links
Player profile and statistics at Cricket Archive
Player profile and statistics at ESPNcricinfo

1955 births
Living people
Cambridgeshire cricketers
Hyderabad (Pakistan) cricketers
Industrial Development Bank of Pakistan cricketers
Kenyan emigrants to Pakistan
Kenyan people of Pakistani descent
Alumni of Newcastle University
Pakistani cricketers
Pakistani expatriates in the United Kingdom
Pakistan Universities cricketers
Sindh cricketers